The Entity is a 1982 American supernatural horror film directed by Sidney J. Furie, and written by Frank De Felitta, who adapted his 1978 novel of the same name. The film stars Barbara Hershey as a single mother in Los Angeles who is raped and tormented by an invisible assailant.

Like the novel, the film is based on the 1974 case of Doris Bither, a woman who claimed to have been repeatedly sexually assaulted by an invisible entity, and who was observed by doctoral students at the University of California, Los Angeles.

Despite being filmed and planned for a release in 1981, the movie was not released in worldwide theaters until September 1982 and February 1983 in the United States.

Plot
In Los Angeles, single mother Carla Moran is violently raped in her home by an invisible assailant. A subsequent episode of poltergeist activity causes her to flee with her children to the home of her best friend Cindy Nash.

They return to Carla's home and the following day, Carla is nearly killed when her car mysteriously goes out of control in traffic. Urged by Cindy to see a psychiatrist, Carla meets with Dr. Sneiderman and tentatively agrees to undergo therapy. A subsequent attack in her bathroom leaves bite marks and bruises, which Carla shows to Dr. Sneiderman, who believes they are self-inflicted despite their location in places impossible for her to reach.

Sneiderman drives Carla home and meets her children. She explains to him that she suffered a variety of traumas in her childhood and adolescence, including sexual and physical abuse, teenage pregnancy, and the violent death of her first husband. Dr. Sneiderman believes her apparent paranormal experiences are delusions resulting from her past psychological trauma, but agrees to keep an open mind at her request. Shortly after Sneiderman leaves, Carla is attacked again, this time in front of her children. Her son tries to intervene, but he is hit by electrical discharges and his wrist is broken.

Carla attends a staff meeting chaired by Sneiderman's colleague, Dr. Weber. As soon as she leaves, Weber shares his belief that the experiences of the Moran household are the output of a mass delusion arising from Carla's damaged psyche, sexual frustration and propensity to masturbate. That night, Carla is tricked by the entity into having an orgasm while she sleeps by appearing to rub her nipples. The next day, Sneiderman urges Carla to commit herself to a psychiatric hospital for observation, but she refuses and becomes angry when Sneiderman goes so far as to suggest she has incestuous feelings for her son.

After Cindy witnesses an attack, the two discuss possible supernatural causes. While visiting a local bookstore, Carla happens to meet two parapsychologists, whom she convinces to visit her home. Initially skeptical, they witness several paranormal events and agree to study the home under the supervision of their team leader, Dr. Cooley. During their study, Sneiderman arrives and tries to convince Carla that the manifestation is in her mind, but she dismisses him. Reassured that her case is taken seriously, Carla begins to relax. Her boyfriend, Jerry Anderson, visits and she suffers a particularly disturbing attack, which he witnesses. Hearing the commotion, Carla’s son enters the room and believes that Jerry is harming her, prompting him to attack Jerry. Later at the hospital, Jerry is so troubled by the experience that he ends their relationship.

Desperate for a solution, Carla agrees to participate in an elaborate experiment carried out by Cooley's team. A full mock-up of her home is created to lure the entity into a trap and freeze it with liquid helium. Before the experiment begins, Sneiderman unsuccessfully tries to convince Carla to leave, confirming an unorthodox personal interest in her predicament. The entity arrives but unexpectedly takes control of the helium jets, using them against Carla. She defiantly stands up to it, stating that it may kill her, but it will never have her. At this precise point, the tanks explode and flood the premises with liquid helium. Sneiderman rushes in just in time to save her. As they look back, they realize that the entity has been trapped in a huge mass of ice. It breaks free and vanishes almost immediately, but Sneiderman realizes that Carla was telling the truth the whole time. Dr. Cooley believes that, despite the destruction of the ice block, she has a valuable witness in Dr. Weber. Much to her chagrin, however, Weber decides to take refuge in the belief that he did not witness anything.

Carla returns to her house the next day. The front door slams by itself and she is greeted by a demonic voice which says, "Welcome home, cunt". She calmly opens the door, exits the house, gets in a car with her family and leaves.

A closing disclaimer verifies that Carla and her family have moved to Texas. Carla still experiences attacks from the entity, although they have lessened in frequency and severity.

Cast

Themes
Film scholar Daniel Kremer interprets The Entity as a parable for female sexual victimhood, citing the lead character of Carla Moran as a woman who "goes head-to-head with a gaggle of men (including the "entity" itself). If the men of the film do not undermine her credibility or sanity, they objectify her, exploit her victimhood, belittle her ability to take control of her unfortunate circumstances, and ultimately give her the dignity of a glorified lab rat."

Production

Screenplay
Screenwriter Frank De Felitta adapted the screenplay from his own novel, which was based on the case of Doris Bither, a woman who alleged to have been sexually assaulted by an invisible supernatural entity on numerous occasions. The screenplay, like the novel, introduces several elements that were not investigated as part of the Bither case (including the allegations of spectral rape and the capture of an entity).

In a rare interview with Rue Morgue magazine in July 2012, director Sidney J. Furie told journalist Michael Doyle that he did not consider The Entity to be a horror film in spite of its extreme imagery, unsettling atmosphere and horrific plot. Instead, Furie said he considers The Entity to be more of a "supernatural suspense movie." Furie also confessed that he intentionally avoided researching the actual case upon which The Entity is based as he "did not want to judge the characters and story in any way." Neither he nor actress Barbara Hershey met with Doris Bither, the woman on whom the character of Carla Moran was based, at any point.

Casting

Several actresses were considered for the role of Carla Moran, including Jill Clayburgh, Sally Field, Jane Fonda, and Bette Midler, but all four declined the offer. Barbara Hershey was cast in the role only ten days before production was scheduled to begin. Hershey had hesitations about the part due to the nudity in the screenplay, but agreed to it after director Sidney J. Furie assured her the nude sequences would be accomplished via body doubles and mannequins. Recalling her casting, Hershey said: "I was frightened. I didn't know how it would be edited or marketed. But I knew that Sid saw potential in the film to approach the subject from a humanistic and psychiatric viewpoint, from a mother's viewpoint...  and I felt it was a worthwhile risk."

Ron Silver was cast as Dr. Sniderman, the psychologist who questions the supernatural nature of Carla's attacks, while Alex Rocco was given the part of Jerry, her absent boyfriend. Furie had originally sought Craig T. Nelson for the role of Jerry, but producer Harold Schneider refused to cast Nelson. David Labiosa, a New York-based actor, was cast as Carla's teenage son Billy, based on his performance in the television film Death Penalty (1980) opposite Colleen Dewhurst.

Filming
The Entity was made under a tax shelter by the newly-established American Cinema International Productions, and had originally been optioned to Roman Polanski. Principal photography of The Entity began in Los Angeles on March 30, 1981. The shoot lasted a period of ten weeks, and was completed in late June 1981. Furie was pleased with the small production, later commenting: "There were no extras waiting in buses, no six camera crews, no bullshit. And at every point, we knew the film was working pretty well." The exteriors of the Moran home were shot at a house in El Segundo, while a set was constructed in Los Angeles for the home's interiors. Stylistically, Furie and his cinematographer, Stephen H. Burum, employed frequent use of close-ups and Dutch angles. The shoot was temporarily halted when Labiosa accidentally broke his wrist while filming a scene in which he is thrown backward by the entity. Labiosa's injury resulted in him being written out of several scenes.

During filming, Furie excised a subplot involving overt incestuous feelings between Carla and her son, Billy. A dream sequence in the original screenplay featured Carla fantasizing about taking her son's virginity. Labiosa recalled: "I think it was awkward for everyone to do, because of what the whole thing implied. I often wonder what the film would have been like had they kept it in." According to Labiosa, a scene was filmed in which Carla observes Billy shirtless outside, which hinted at this subplot, but this scene was cut from the film.

The majority of the special effects in the film were achieved with practical methods, and were supervised by Stan Winston. For example, the scene in which Carla's nude body is groped by the entity was shot featuring a latex dummy body with suction cups built inside, which allowed crew members to manipulate it to appear as though fingers were making impressions on her flesh; Hershey's body, aside from her head, was hidden beneath the bed during this scene. The construction of the dummy body cost the production $65,000 to create.

The film would be among the final productions made by American Cinema Productions before it filed for bankruptcy in December 1981.

Release

Box office
The film opened in the United Kingdom on September 30, 1982 and was met by protests from women's rights groups who deemed the film offensive due to its graphic depictions of sexual assault. 20th Century Fox released the film in the United States on February 4, 1983, with little prepublicity. It grossed $3.7 million during its opening weekend, going on to gross a total of $13.3 million. In response to the protests against the film, star Barbara Hershey publicly responded, telling a reporter: "I resent being put in the position of defending the film. We worked really hard not to make it exploitative. Rape is one of the ugliest if not the ugliest thing that can happen to someone. It's murder of a sort. I have no answer for those people who are offended."

Reception and legacy

Critical response
The review aggregator website Rotten Tomatoes reported a 62% approval rating based on 13 reviews, with an average rating of 5.8/10.

Richard F. Shepard, in a New York Times review, praised Hershey's performance but went on to say "The Entity offers thrills in short staccato bursts and dull science in long bursts."

Contemporary criticism of the film has been favorable: Andrew Dowler of the Toronto publication Now praised the lead performances, writing: "Hershey gives Carla a believable mix of hopelessness and grit, and Ron Silver strikes the right note as an over-assertive psychologist who may have more than a professional interest in the case. Director Sidney J. Furie keeps them in the foreground, but uses slightly off-kilter angles to make his very ordinary settings creepy and cramped." American film theorist Michael Atkinson lauded the film, writing: "There may not be, outside of David Cronenberg's wonder cabinet, a more nitro-powered horror-movie metaphor hell than that fueling this post-Exorcist remnant...  It's like the movie is writing its own library of fiery feminist theory. It remains unnerving and savage, arguably the most eloquent movie ever made in Hollywood about the struggle of the sexual underclass."

Director Martin Scorsese has also remarked his appreciation for the film, and ranked it the fourth-scariest horror film of all time, above Psycho and The Shining.

Home media
Anchor Bay Entertainment released The Entity on DVD in 2005, and later issued a standalone Blu-ray disc in July 2012. On June 11, 2019, Scream Factory released a collector's edition Blu-ray disc of the film featuring new interviews and other newly-commissioned bonus material.

Other uses in media
Avant-garde filmmaker Peter Tscherkassky used a print of this film for his 1999 short Outer Space.

Awards and nominations

Remake
In April 2015, it was announced that James Wan and Roy Lee were producing a remake for 20th Century Fox through their Atomic Monster Productions and Vertigo Entertainment banners, respectively. The film would be written by Chad Hayes and Carey W. Hayes.

See also
 List of ghost films
 Spectrophilia
Poltergeist, the 1982 Tobe Hooper film similar in content

References

Sources

Notes
Michael Doyle, "The Devil's Plaything", Rue Morgue #124 (July 2012), p. 16-22.
Michael Doyle, "Home is Where the Hell Is", Rue Morgue #124 (July 2012), p. 20-21.

External links
 
 
 
 
 GhostTheory.com interview with one of Doris Bither's sons.

1982 films
1982 horror films
1980s ghost films
20th Century Fox films
American ghost films
American haunted house films
American psychological horror films
American supernatural horror films
1980s English-language films
American films based on actual events
Films based on American horror novels
Films directed by Sidney J. Furie
Films scored by Charles Bernstein
Films set in Los Angeles
Films shot in Los Angeles
1980s American films